Labeobarbus steindachneri is a species of ray-finned fish in the genus Labeobarbus is found from Cameroon to Cabinda.

References 

steindachneri
Taxa named by George Albert Boulenger
Fish described in 1910